This is a list of adult fiction books that topped The New York Times Fiction Best Seller list in 1950. Henry Morton Robinson's The Cardinal dominated the list for 24 weeks and Ernest Hemingway had his only Number 1 bestseller that year.

1950
.
1950 in the United States